The yellow-headed caracara (Milvago chimachima) is a bird of prey in the family Falconidae, the falcons and caracaras. It is found in Nicaragua, Costa Rica, Panama, every mainland South American country except Chile, and on Aruba, Bonaire, Curaçao, and Trinidad and Tobago.

Taxonomy and systematics

Louis Jean Pierre Vieillot described the yellow-headed caracara as Polyborus chimachima, putting it in the same genus as the crested caracaras. In 1824, German naturalist Johann Baptist von Spix created the genus Milvago for this species and the closely related chimango caracara.

The taxonomy of the caracaras has not been settled. The American Ornithological Society and the International Ornithological Committee place the yellow-headed and chimango caracaras in genus Milvago. BirdLife International's Handbook of the Birds of the World places the yellow-headed caracara alone in Milvago and the chimango caracara and four others in genus Phalcoboenus. The Clements taxonomy places the yellow-headed, chimango, and four other caracaras in genus Daptrius. The other systems place only the black caracara in Daptrius.

The worldwide systems agree that the yellow-headed caracara has two subspecies, the nominate M. c. chimachima and M. c. cordata.

A larger and stouter paleosubspecies, M. c. readei, occurred in Florida and possibly elsewhere some tens of thousand years ago, during the Late Pleistocene.

Description

Males weigh  and females . The sexes' plumages are alike. Adults of the nominate subspecies have buff to creamy yellowish white head, neck, and underparts with a thin dark streak through the eye. Their back and wings are blackish brown with a whitish patch at the base of the primaries that shows in flight. Their uppertail coverts and tail are buff with dusky bars and the tail has a black band near the end. Their iris is reddish brown surrounded by bare bright yellow skin and their legs and feet are pea green. Immature birds have browner upperparts than adults and their underparts have brown streaks. Subspecies M. c. cordata is a darker buff on the head and underparts than the nominate and has narrower bars on the tail.

Distribution and habitat

Subspecies M. c. cordata is found in southwestern Nicaragua, western Costa Rica, and most of Panama, and in mainland South America from Colombia east through Venezuela and the Guianas, south through Ecuador and Peru east of the Andes, and across Brazil north of the Amazon River. The Nicaragua records are only since 2008, and there are also scattered eBird records as far north as Guatemala and Belize. Off the north coast of the South American mainland it occurs on Aruba, Trinidad, and Tobago, and has visited Bonaire and Curaçao as a vagrant. The nominate M. c. chimachima is found from eastern Bolivia south through Paraguay into northern Argentina and east through northern Uruguay and Brazil south of the Amazon River. Its range overlaps with that of the chimango caracara in southern Brazil, northern Argentina, Paraguay and Uruguay.

The yellow-headed caracara is a bird of lightly-treed open landscapes, like savanna with palms and scattered trees, ranchland and pastures, gallery forest, and the edges of denser forest.

Behavior

Movement

The yellow-headed caracara is generally sedentary, but records from northern Central America and islands off the north coast of South America indicate that individuals do wander. Within its usual range it colonizes cleared areas.

Feeding

The yellow-headed caracara is omnivorous and relies heavily on scavenging. Its diet includes carrion, insects (adult and larval), crabs, fish, reptiles, amphibians, mammals, bird eggs and nestlings, horse dung, fruits such as those of oil palm (Elaeis guineensis), coconut, and maize, and seeds. It also takes ticks from cattle and other large mammals like tapirs, and enlarges open wounds. Much of its diet is taken while walking on the ground, but it does some hunting on the wing. It has been observed also to forage for small invertebrates in the fur of brown-throated three-toed sloths. Mixed-species feeding flocks apparently do not regard it as a threat, not making alarm calls during encounters.

Breeding

The yellow-headed caracara's nesting season varies geographically. It spans December to April in Costa Rica. In Colombia there appear to be two seasons, January to April and July to September. It includes August in Venezuela. Egg laying has been recorded in May in Guyana, in July and August in central Brazil, and in September in southern Brazil. The clutch size has been reported as one or two eggs and also as four. The incubation period is about 22 days, fledging occurs 17 to 20 days after hatch, and young are dependent on the parents for about three more weeks. The female does most of incubating but both parents provision the young.

Vocalization

The yellow-headed caracara is vocal mostly during the breeding season and also when quarreling over food. Its most common calls are a "scratchy wailing keeeah or a more drawn-out keeeeeeeee"; the calls are sometimes made singly but more often repeated. Other calls are a "more growling kraaa-kraaa-kraaa or krrrr-krrrr-krrrr; [a] piercing chay; and [a] thin hissing whistle, ksyeh, ksyeh."

Status

The IUCN has assessed the yellow-headed caracara as being of Least Concern. It has an extremely large range and an estimated population of at least five million mature individuals that is believed to be increasing. No immediate threats have been identified. It "will certainly move into lowland areas as they are converted from forest to cattle ranches or to small- or to medium-scale farming."

Gallery

References

Further reading

External links

 

yellow-headed caracara
yellow-headed caracara
Birds of South America
Birds of Costa Rica
Birds of Panama
Birds of Trinidad and Tobago
Birds of the Caribbean
yellow-headed caracara
yellow-headed caracara